Roger Newman (31 August 1940 – 4 March 2010) was a British born-American soap opera actor and writer. He was born in London, and died in New York City.

Newman began his career as a child in radio.  He moved with his family to Montréal after World War II, and he eventually settled in the United States.  He served in the US Army and attended Columbia University.

His credits included Guiding Light, where he met his wife, the actor and writer Frances Myers.  He also had a short role as Joe on The Edge of Night. He was a member of a team of writers who received an Emmy Award in 1993 for "The Guiding Light."

Positions held
The Edge of Night
Actor: 1967

Guiding Light
Actor: April 20, 1970 – October 30, 1972; February 26, 1973 – April 25, 1975; September 1, 1998 – February 22, 1999
Script Writer: 1992 – 1999

Another World
Script Writer: 1983 – 1988

One Life to Live 
Script Writer: 1991 – 1992

Passions
Script Writer: 1999 – 2004

Awards and nominations
Daytime Emmy Awards

WINS
(1993; Best Writing; Guiding Light)

NOMINATIONS 
(1985 & 1989; Best Writing; Another World)
(1999; Best Writing; Guiding Light)
(2001, 2002 & 2003; Best Writing; Passions)

Writers Guild of America Award

WINS
(1993 season; One Life to Live)

NOMINATIONS 
(1995, 1996, 1998 & 1999 seasons; Guiding Light)
(2001 seasons; Passions)

References

External links

1940 births
2010 deaths
Male actors from London
English male child actors
English emigrants to the United States
American male soap opera actors
American soap opera writers
American male television writers
Daytime Emmy Award winners
Writers Guild of America Award winners
Columbia University alumni
Deaths from cancer in New York (state)